Srđan "Riki" Antić (born 10 December 1960) is a Serbian professional basketball coach.

Early life 
Antić played basketball in Partizan Belgrade, but unfortunately his career as a basketball player ended, due to an injury, before he was able to join the senior team.

Coaching career
Antić’s coaching career started in 1981 as the junior team assistant coach in club Voždovac in Belgrade. The following season he moved to the Partizan women's team, with whom he won three Yugoslav League championships (in 1984, 1985 and 1986), two Yugoslav Women's Basketball Cups (in 1985 and 1986), also as the head coach of the Partizan U-16 team, he won first Yugoslav Cadet Championship in the club’s history.

In 2000, he had a stint in the newly formed Vojvodina NIS of the YUBA League.

Antić worked in Libya, United Arab Emirates and Saudi Arabia for several years. In Libya he served as the head coach of three teams of the Libyan Division I League (Al Ittihad Tripoli, Al Nasr Benghazi and Al Madena Tripoli) as well as of the Libyan national team. In Dubai, he coached the Al Naser and the Al Wasl of the UAE League for one season each. He was awarded the title "The Best Coach" at the Dubai International Tournament (2008). During 2009–10 season, he coached the Al-Ahli Jeddah of the Saudi Premier League and won the Saudi Arabia Prince Faisal bin Fahad Cup.

In 2013, Antić become the head coach for the Jászberényi of the Hungarian League. In 2016, he was the head coach of the Iraq national team and placed 4th at the 2016 FIBA Asia Challenge in Iran.

References

External links
 Official Website

1960 births
Living people
Serbian men's basketball coaches
Sportspeople from Belgrade
KK Vojvodina Srbijagas coaches
KK Crvena zvezda assistant coaches
ŽKK Crvena zvezda coaches
ŽKK Partizan coaches
Serbian expatriate basketball people in Spain
Serbian expatriate basketball people in Libya
Serbian expatriate basketball people in Iraq
Serbian expatriate basketball people in Portugal
Serbian expatriate basketball people in the United Arab Emirates
Serbian expatriate basketball people in Saudi Arabia
Serbian expatriate basketball people in Hungary